Lhaimagu Faqeeraa is a mystic most famously mentioned in the folklore of . He is supposed to have lived in Lhaimagu island, in the Maldives.

The word  comes from the word fakir, which is a Sufi, especially one who performs feats of endurance or apparent magic.

Footnotes

External links
 http://www.qaumiyyath.gov.mv/documents.php

Maldivian Sufis
Maldivian legends
Maldivian culture